Tieling High School (or Tieling Senior Middle School) is a senior high school located in Fanhe Town, Tieling. It currently has a faculty number of 238 and enrolls approx. 1000 students annually. Situated in the west of Fanhe, it's surrounded by several real estate developments and Tieling Experimental School.

References

External links
 

Education in Liaoning
Tieling
High schools in Liaoning